The 2019 Inter-Provincial Cup was the seventh edition of the Inter-Provincial Cup, a List A cricket competition for teams from Ireland. It was the third edition of the competition to be played with List A status. Leinster Lightning were the defending champions.

Unlike previous editions of the tournament, an extra round of matches took place outside of the normal domestic calendar, with matches played at the La Manga Club Ground, Spain, in April 2019. The tournament was originally scheduled to start on 22 April 2019, but was postponed by 24 hours due to heavy rain. However, the opening fixture was abandoned without a ball being bowled due to a wet outfield.

Leinster Lightning retained their title, after their match on 22 August 2019 against the North West Warriors was abandoned due to rain.

Points table
The following teams competed:

Fixtures

1st match

2nd match

3rd match

4th match

5th match

6th match

7th match

8th match

9th match

References

External links
 Series home at ESPN Cricinfo

Interprovincial Cup
Inter-Provincial Cup seasons